The Journal Standard is an American daily newspaper published Mondays through Saturdays in Freeport, Illinois. It is owned by Gannett.

The newspaper's coverage area includes Carroll, Jo Daviess, Ogle and Stephenson counties.

References

External links 
 

Gannett publications
Newspapers published in Illinois
Freeport, Illinois
Stephenson County, Illinois
Publications established in 1848